The 2000–01 VfL Bochum season was the 63rd season in club history.

Review and events
On 13 February 2001 head coach Ralf Zumdick was sacked and replaced by caretaker Rolf Schafstall.

Matches

Legend

Bundesliga

DFB-Pokal

Squad

Squad and statistics

Squad, appearances and goals scored

Transfers

Summer

In:

Out:

Winter

In:

Out:

VfL Bochum II

Sources

External links
 2000–01 VfL Bochum season at Weltfussball.de 
 2000–01 VfL Bochum season at kicker.de 
 2000–01 VfL Bochum season at Fussballdaten.de 

Bochum
VfL Bochum seasons